This is a list of notable pipe organ builders.

Australia 
 William Anderson (1832–1921)
 Australian Pipe Organs Pty Ltd
 Robert Cecil Clifton (1854–1931)
 William Davidson
 J. E. Dodd & Sons Gunstar Organ Works
 Fincham & Hobday
 Geo. Fincham & Son
 Alfred Fuller (1845–1923)
 Hargraves Pipe Organs Pty Ltd
 William Hill & Son & Norman & Beard Ltd (Australian subsidiary)
 Peter D. G. Jewkes Pty Ltd
 Johnson & Kinloch
 Samuel Joscelyne
 Carl Krüger (1802–1871)
 Ernst Ladegast (1853–1937)
 F. J. Larner & Co.
 Laurie Pipe Organs
 C. W. Leggo
 Daniel Heinrich Lemke (c. 1832–1897)
 Samuel Marshall
 Joseph Massey (1854–1943)
 James Moyle
 Pierce Pipe Organs
 Pitchford & Garside
 Roger Pogson
 Charles Richardson (1847–1926)
 William Leopold Roberts (died 1971), built "Memorial Organ" (1924–1961) for St Andrew's Church, Brighton
 Ronald Sharp (1929–2021)
 Knud Smenge
 Frederick Taylor

Austria 
 Matthäus Abbrederis (1652 – c. 1725)
 Orgelbau Pieringer
 Rieger Orgelbau

Belgium 
 Georges Cloetens (1871–1949)
 Forceville – Antwerp
 Johannes Thomas Forceville (1696–1750)
 Matthijs Langhedul (?–1636)
 Mortier – Antwerp
 Jan Lapon – Diksmuide

Canada 
 Casavant Frères (Joseph Casavant) – Saint-Hyacinthe, Québec
 Legge Organ Co. Ltd – Toronto, Ontario
 Gabriel Kney – London, Ontario
  – Saint-Hyacinthe, Québec
 Louis Mitchell – Quebec
 Orgues Létourneau – Saint-Hyacinthe, Québec
 Laliberté-Payment – Repentigny, Québec
 Karl Wilhelm – Mont-Saint-Hilaire, Québec
 Hellmuth Wolff, Wolff & Associés – Laval, Québec
 R. A. Denton & Son – Hamilton, Ontario
 Juget-Sinclair – Montréal, Québec

Cuba 
 Hermanos Cuayo (Fábricantes de Órganos, Holguin)

Czech Republic 
 Rieger-Kloss

Denmark 
 Poul-Gerhard Andersen (1904–1980)
 Frobenius Orgelbyggeri
 Marcussen & Søn

France 
 Alexandre
 Charles S. Barker
 Quentin Blumenroeder
 Daublaine & Callinet
 Aristide Cavaillé-Coll
 Joseph Merklin
 Charles Mutin
 Puget Family
 Dom Bédos de Celles (1709–1779)
 François-Henri Clicquot
 Robert Clicquot
 Charles Lefebvre (1670–1737)
 Clément Lefebvre (1630–1709)
 Jean-Baptiste Nicolas Lefebvre (1705–1784)
 Louis-Charles Lefebvre (1708–1754)
 Koenig
 Claude Parisot
 Georges Danion
 Victor Gonzalez
 Jean-Loup and Robert Boisseau
 Bertrand Cattiaux
 Pascal Quoirin

Germany 
 Jürgen Ahrend – Leer, Lower Saxony
 Michael Becker Orgelbau
 Rudolf von Beckerath (1907–1976)
 Peter Breisiger (1516–1542)
 Zacharias Hildebrandt (1688–1757)
Albertus Antoni Hinsz (1704–1785)
 Hofbauer – Göttingen
 Elias Hößler (1663–1746)
 Stephan Kaschendorf (c. 1425–c. 1499)
 Emanuel Kemper, Lübeck
 Orgelbau Klais (Johannes Klais Orgelbau GmbH & Co. KG) – Bonn, North Rhine-Westphalia
 Friedrich Krebs (?–1493)
 Friedrich Ladegast (1818–1905) – Weissenfels
 Orgelbau Mebold, Siegen
 Johann Josua Mosengel (1663–1731)
 Arp Schnitger (1648–1719)
 Schuke family, three generations, two workshops, one in Potsdam (1884), Alexander Schuke Potsdam Orgelbau, one in Berlin (1953), Karl Schuke Berliner Orgelbauwerkstatt
 Gottfried Silbermann (1683–1753)
 Christian Gottlob Steinmüller (1792–1864)
 Georg Christoph Stertzing (c. 1650–1717)
 Tobias Heinrich Gottfried Trost (c. 1679–1759)
 Heinrich Traxdorf (built organs in the mid-15th century)
 Orgelbau Vleugels (Orgelbau Vleugels GmbH) – Hardheim, Baden-Wuerttemberg
 Walcker Orgelbau (E.F. Walcker Orgelbau) – Ludwigsburg, Baden-Württemberg
 M. Welte & Sons – Freiburg im Breisgau, Baden-Württemberg
 Johann Friedrich Wender (1655–1729) – Mühlhausen
 Glatter-Götz Orgelbau – Pfullendorf Germany
 Wolkenstayn Orgelbau – Kötz, Germany

Hungary 
 Aquincum Organbuilder Company
 Pécs Organ Manufactory

Ireland 
 Trevor Crowe
 Kenneth Jones and Associates (1979–present) – Kilcoole, Co Wicklow
 Neiland & Creane Organ Builders (1990–present) – Wexford

Italy 
 Agati
 Antegnati – Brescia
 Bossi – Italian firm of organ builders originally from Mendrisio (Canton Ticino)
 CHICHI Organi – Firenze
 Consoli Pipe Organs, Locorotondo, Bari, Apulia
 Lorenzo Musante − Genoa
Mascioni - Cuvio (Varese)
 Organi Pinchi, Trevi, Umbria
 Giovanni Pradella – Sondrio
 Fratelli Ruffatti – Padua
 Tamburini − Crema, Lombardy

The Netherlands 
Bätz, Utrecht (1709–1770)
De Gebroeders Adema, Hillegom
Duyschot, Holland
 Flentrop, Zaandam
 Hendrik Niehoff (1495–1561)
 J. L. van den Heuvel Orgelbouw, Dordrecht
Rodensteen family (also given as Raphaëlis, Rottstein, and Rottenstein-Pock), 15th century Dutch family of organ builders 
Pels & van Leeuwen, Rosmalen
Reil, Heerde
Van Dam, Leeuwarden
Van Deventer, Gendt
Van Vulpen, Utrecht
Witte, Utrecht

New Zealand 
 South Island Organ Company

Poland 

Cepka Marek
Drozdowicz Jan
Jakubowski Mirosław
Kamińscy
Mollin Zdzisław
Nawrot Marian
Olejnik Adam
Śliwiński Jan (finished)
Truszczyński Włodzimierz (finished)
Zych – Zakłady Organowe (the biggest Polish organbuilder)

Portugal 
 António Xavier Machado e Cerveira

Slovenia 
 Skrabl (Škrabl) – Home
 Orglarstvo Mocnik (Močnik) – Orglarstvo Močnik

South Africa 
 R Muller – Potchestroom
 van Schalkwyk Organ  Builders - Cape Town & Surrounding areas 
 SAOB (South African Organ Builders / Suid Afrikaanse Orrel Bouers) – Pretoria (Now Defunct)
 Cooper Gill & Tomkins – Cape Town

 Pekelharing Organ Building – Port Elizabeth
 Protea Orrelbouers – Brandfort
 Jan Zielman Orrelbouers – Pretoria
 Pyporrels (Werner Hurter) – Pretoria

Spain 
 Blancafort, OM. 
 Gerhard Grenzing 
 Lope Alberdi Ricalde (1869–1948)
 Federico Acitores, Acitores Organería y Arte S.L.
 Jordi Bosch

Switzerland 

 Orgelbau Thomas Wälti – Gümligen
 Orgelbau Kuhn AG – Männedorf
 Metzler Orgelbau – Dietikon
 Mathis Orgelbau – Näfels
 Orgelbau Goll – Luzern
 Späth Orgelbau – Rüti, Zürich
 Orgelbau Graf – Oberkirch
 Orgelbau Roman Steiner – Fehren
 Orgelbau Felsberg – Felsberg
 Manufacture d'Orgues Füglister – Grimisuat
 Erni Orgelbau – Stans
 Peter Meier Orgelbau – Rheinfelden
 Lifart Orgelbau AG – Emmen
 Flayer Manufacture d'Orgues – Ursy
 Arno Caluori Orgelbau – Seewis
 Armin Hauser Orgelbau – Kleindöttingen
 Orgelbau Stemmer – Zumikon
 Manufacture d'orgues St. Martin S.A. Chézard-Saint-Martin

Turkey
 Istanbul Pipe Organ Team (?-present) – Istanbul

United Kingdom

Current (post-2016) 
 Balfour-Rowley Ltd. Organ Builders (2016–present) – Worksop
 Benson George Bristol 1881- 1911 built Organs in primitive methodist churches around the city - mainly demolished. Appears in Arrowsmith Directory of Bristol 1906.
 Bishop & Sons (1795–present ) – London and Ipswich
 W & A Boggis (1932–present) – Roydon, South Norfolk
 F. Booth & Son Ltd. (1951–present) – Stanningley, West Yorkshire
 Bower & Company (1972–present) – Wroxham, Norfolk
 F. H. Browne & Sons (1870–present) – Canterbury, Kent. 
 From 1 October 2020 the company trades under the name of Mander Organs.
 A. J. Carter Organ Builder Ltd. (1984–present) – Stanley, West Yorkshire
 Vincent Coggin Organ Builder (c.1980–present) – Terrington St Clement, Norfolk
 Cooper & Co. Organ Builders (2011–present) –  Ryde
 Cousans Organs (1877–present) – formerly Lincoln now Leicester
Percy Daniel & Co (c.1919–present) – Clevedon
 Dean Organ Builders (1970–present) (Bristol, England)
 William Drake (1974–present) – Buckfastleigh, Devon
 Duplex Pipe Organ and Blower Company (2001–present) – Farnham, Surrey
 Forth Pipe Organs Limited (2002–present) – Rosyth, Fife
 Lance Foy Organs (?-present) – Truro, Cornwall
 Martin Goetze and Dominic Gwynn Ltd (1980–present) – formerly Northampton, now Welbeck, Nottinghamshire
 Henry Groves & Son Ltd (1957–present) – Nottingham
 Norman Hall & Sons (c.1969–present) – Cambridge, Cambridgeshire
 Harrison and Harrison Ltd (1861–present) – Durham, County Durham
 Holmes and Swift Organ Builders (c.1979–present) –  Fakenham, Norfolk
 Charles James Organs (2004–present) – Ashwell, Rutland
 Jennings Organs (1989–present) – Cranham Chase, Dorset
 E.J. Johnson & Son (Cambridge) Ltd. (c.1955–present) – Snetterton, Norfolk
 Peter Jones Organ Builder (1979–present) – St John's, Isle of Man
 Lammermuir Pipe Organs (1983–present) – Oldhamstocks, East Lothian
 Jonathan Lane & Associates Ltd. (2006–present) – Epsom, Surrey
 Michael Macdonald Organ Builder (1975–present) – Simshill, Glasgow
 Midland Organ, Hele & Co. Ltd (1860–present) – Burton Lazars, Leicestershire
 T. R. Moore Ltd (2017–present) – Nottingham
 Nicholson & Co (Worcester) Ltd (1841–present) – Malvern, Worcestershire
 Gary Owens Organ Builders (2001–present) – Pontypool
 Pennine Organ Services (?-present) – Barnsley, South Yorkshire.
 Pipe Organ Preservation Co. (1999–present) – Belfast
 Pipe Organ Services Ltd. (c.1985–present)- formerly Salisbury, and since 1996 Saxby, Melton Mowbray.
 Positive Organ Company Ltd (2020–present) – Brackley, Northamptonshire
 Principal Pipe Organs (1983–present) – York, North Yorkshire
 D. Roberts Organ Builders Ltd (2003–present) – Seaham Harbour, Durham
 Sheppard & Cross Pipe Organ Services Ltd (2017–present) – Uckfield, Sussex 
 B. C. Shepherd & Sons Organ Builders (1927–present) – Edgware
 David Shuker | At the Sign of the Pipe (2009–present) – Birling, Kent
 George Sixsmith & Son Ltd. (1955–present) – Mossley, Greater Manchester
 Soundcraft Pipe Organ Company (2016–present) – Northampton, Northamptonshire
 Peter Spencer Ltd (1997–present) – Bubbenhall, Warwickshire
 J. M. Spink (c.1970–present) – Leeds, West Yorkshire
 The Village Workshop (c.1994–present) – Finchingfield
 J. W. Walker & Sons Ltd (1828–present) – Brandon, Suffolk
 David Wells Organ Builders Ltd (1981–present) – Liverpool
 Wells-Kennedy Partnership (1966–present) – Lisburn
 Henry Willis & Sons Ltd; (1845–present) – variously, London, Petersfield and Liverpool
 Wood Pipe Organ Builders (1966–present) – Huddersfield

Defunct 
 Abbott and Smith (1869–1964) – Leeds
 Cedric Arnold (1927-1961) - Chelmsford then Thaxted 
 Cedric Arnold, Williamson & Hyatt (1961-1973) - Thaxted 
 Theodore Charles Bates and Sons (–) – Ludgate Hill, London
 G. Bedwell & Son (1871–1946) – Cambridge
 Henry Bevington (1794–?) – London
 James Jepson Binns – Leeds, Yorkshire
 Blackett & Howden (c.1890-1970)
 Richard Bridge (?–before 1766) – London
 Brindley & Foster (1871–1939) – Sheffield, Yorkshire
 Cambridge Organ Company (?–?)
 Messrs Casey & Cairney (?–c.1971?) – Glasgow
 Casson's Patent Organ Co Ltd. (1887–95), thereafter trading as Mitchell and Thynne.- Denbigh and London. 
 Nigel Church Organs Ltd. (1971–1997) – Stamfordham, Northumberland
 A. J. Claypole (1914–1936) – located on Narrow St. Peterborough
 James Cole [a.k.a. James Cole & Son, Cole & Duckworth, Jas. Y. Duckworth (Late Cole & Son)] (fl.1855–88) – Manchester
 Peter Collins (1964–2017) – Melton Mowbray, Leicestershire
 John Compton (1865–1957)
 David Coram (?–2019) – Fordingbridge, Hampshire
 Martin Cross Organ Builder (1969–2017) – Stifford, near Grays, Essex 
 Thomas Dallam (159? - 167?) and his sons, Robert, Ralph and George - London.
 Degens & Rippin Ltd (1960–64) – London
 East Midlands Organ Company (?–?)
Driver & Haigh (1882 -1969) – Bradford
 Thomas Elliott (1790–1825) – London
 Elliott and Hill (1825–32) – London
 Forster and Andrews (1845–1956) – variously Hull, London, York
 August Gern (1866–1938) – London
 S. E. Gilks (?1950–?1976) – Peterborough
 Gray & Davison (1841–1973) – London
 Grant, Degens & Rippin (1964–66) – London
 Grant, Degens & Bradbeer (1967–1981) – London, then Northampton
 J Halmshaw & Sons (1850–1913) – Birmingham, Warwickshire
 Renatus Harris (son of Thomas Harris and father of John Harris) (c. 1652–1724)
 William Hedgeland (1851-c.1891; merged with Bishop & Sons) – Paddington, London
 Hele & Co (1865–2017) – Truro, then Plymouth
 William Hill & Sons Ltd (1832–1916) – London
 William Hill & Son & Norman & Beard Ltd. (1916–98) – London
 Robert Hope-Jones (1851–1914) 
 A. Hunter & Son (1856–1937) – Clapham
 R. Huntingford (?- early c20) – location unknown
 Kenneth James and Sons Ltd (c.1970–90) – location unknown.
 T. S. Jones (?-?) – London
Ernest Lifford & Co. (1914–1940) – Yeovil
 Henry Cephas Lincoln (fl. 1810–55) – London
 John Lincoln (fl.1789–1820) – London
 Lewis & Co (1860–1919) – Brixton, London Borough of Lambeth
 Charles Lloyd  – Nottingham, Nottinghamshire
 C.F. Lloyd (son of Charles Lloyd) – Nottingham, Nottinghamshire
 Longstaff & Jones (c.1970-c.2009) – Telford, West Midlands.
 John Loosemore (1616–1681) – Devon
 Mander Organs Ltd (1936–2020) – London. 
In July 2020 the company went into liquidation. The company name and intellectual property were acquired by F. H. Browne and Sons Ltd (of Canterbury) with that firm trading as Mander Organs from 1 October 2020.
J.E. Minns (1879–1895) – Taunton. Company purchased by George Osmond.
 Norman and Beard Ltd (1870–1916) – London
Geo. Osmond & Co. (1895–1988)  – Taunton. Succeeded J.E. Minns and traded under that name until 1908.
 Albert E. Pease (1890–1909) – Stoke Newington, London
 The Positive Organ Company Ltd. (1898–1941) – London.
 Roger Pulham (fl. 1970–2010) – Woodbridge, Suffolk.
 Rushworth and Dreaper – Liverpool, Merseyside
 Bernard Schmidt ("Father Smith") (c. 1630–1708)
George Sherborne (c.1800–1862) – Bath
 John Snetzler (fl. 1741–1781) – London
 A.E. & F. A. Still (?-?) – location?
 Thomas Swarbrick (fl. 1705/6-c.1753) – London then Warwick
 Kenneth Tickell & Company (1982–2020) – Wellingborough.
 Trevor Tipple (fl. 1978–2015) – Worcester.
 H S Vincent & Co. – Sunderland
 W.G. Vowles (1856–1958) – Bristol
 Andrew Watt & Son (?-1965) – Glasgow
 Peter Wells Organ Builders (1974–2015) – Cranbrook, Kent
 Williamson & Hyatt (1950-1961) - Trunch 
 Samuel Wort (fl.1916–38) – 1/. Holloway, 2/. Camden Town, London.
 E. Wragg & Son (1894–1969) – Nottingham, Nottinghamshire
 Alexander Young & Sons (1872–1927) – Manchester

United States 
 Organ Historical Society Pipe Organ Database for nearly complete list, current and historical. Pipe Organ Database
 Abbott and Sieker
 Æolian Company (see also Æolian-Skinner Organ Company)
 Æolian-Skinner Organ Company (1932–1972)
 Joseph Alley (1804–1880)
 Andover Organ Company
 Alvinza Andrews (1800–1862)
 Thomas Appleton (1785–1872)
 George Ashdown Audsley (1838–1925)
 Austin Organs, Inc., Hartford, Connecticut
 Balcom and Vaughan, Seattle
 Barton Organ Company, Oshkosh, Wisconsin
 Bedient Pipe Organ Company, Lincoln, Nebraska
 Bigelow & Company, American Fork, Utah
 GM Buck Pipe Organs, Grand Rapids, Michigan
 John Brombaugh & Associates, Eugene, Oregon
 Dobson Pipe Organ Builders, Lake City, Iowa
 E. and G.G. Hook & Hastings, Boston, Massachusetts
 Estey Organ, Brattleboro, Vermont
 Fabry Inc. Pipe Organ Builders, Antioch, IL (1955–)
 Felgemaker Organ Company
 C. B. Fisk, Inc., Gloucester, Massachusetts
 Charles Brenton Fisk, C. B. Fisk, Inc.'s founder (1925–1983)
 Paul Fritts & Company Organ Builders, Tacoma, Washington
 Geneva Organ Company
 William M. Goodrich (1777–1833)
 Goulding and Wood, Inc., Indianapolis, Indiana (founded 1980)
 G. Donald Harrison (1889–1956)
 Hendrickson Organ Company, St. Peter, Minnesota
 Hillgreen-Lane
 Hinners Organ Company (1879–1942)
 Otto Hofmann (1918–2001), Austin, Texas
 Robert Hope-Jones, Elmira, New York
 Holtkamp Organ Company, Cleveland, Ohio
 Johnson Organs – Wm. A. Johnson, later Johnson & Son
 Thomas Johnston
 Kegg Pipe Organ Builders (Hartville, Ohio)
 Kilgen, St. Louis
 W. W. Kimball Piano and Organ
 Leek Pipe Organ Company, Berea, Ohio (since 2014), formerly Oberlin, Ohio, (from 1976)
 Levsen Organ Company (from 1954) around Buffalo, Iowa
 Link Piano and Organ Company
 Los Angeles Art Organ Company, The
 M.P. Moller Pipe Organ Company, Hagerstown, Maryland
 Charles McManis (1913–2004)
 Marr and Colton, Warsaw, New York (1915–1932)
 Midmer-Losh Organ Company, Merrick, New York
 David A. Moore, North Pomfret, Vermont
 Robert Morton Organ Company, Van Nuys, California (1920s–1931)
 Noack Organ Company, Georgetown, Massachusetts
 Olympic Organ Builders, Seattle
 J. H. & C. S. Odell, New York City
 Organ Supply Industries, Erie, Pennsylvania
 Page Organ Company, Lima, Ohio
 Parkey Organs, Atlanta, GA
 Pasi Organ Builders, Roy, Washington
 Peragallo Pipe Organ Company, Paterson, New Jersey
 Henry Pilcher (1798–1880), Pilcher Brothers, H. Pilcher's Sons, Newark, St. Louis, Chicago, New Orleans, Louisville (to 1944)
H. Ronald Poll & Associates, Inc. SLC, Utah (1979–2020)
 Quimby Pipe Organs, Warrensburg, Missouri
 Reuter Organ Company, Lawrence, Kansas
 Richards, Fowkes & Co., Ooltewah, Tennessee
 Schantz Organ Company, Orrville, Ohio
 A. E. Schlueter Pipe Organ Company, Lithonia (Atlanta), Georgia
 Schoenstein & Co., Benicia, California
 Schuelke Organ Company, Milwaukee, Wisconsin
 Ernest M. Skinner (1866–1960)
 David Tannenberg (1728–1824), Lititz, Pennsylvania
 Taylor & Boody Organ Company
 Tellers Organ Company, Erie, Pennsylvania
 Wangerin Organ Company, Milwaukee, Wisconsin
 M. Welte & Sons, Inc., New York (1832–1932)
 Wicks Organ Company, Highland, Illinois
 Rudolph Wurlitzer Company, Cincinnati, Ohio (1856–1988)
 Cornel Zimmer Organ builders, Denver, NC (1992–)
 Buzard Pipe Organ Builders, LLC Champaign, IL (1985–)
 Parsons Pipe Organ Builders, Canandaigua, New York (1921–Present)

References

Bibliography

Organ builders, pipe